Cache is an unincorporated community in Alexander County, Illinois, United States. Cache, sometimes called North Cairo, was laid out January 20, 1904 for B.M. Cyril, President of City Manufacturing Company. Cache is located near the Mississippi River west of Mounds. It is served by Illinois Route 3. Beech Ridge Post Office was moved to Bourland's store, operated by O.R. Bourland, and renamed Cache. It opened October 15, 1914. Cache once had a post office, which closed on October 5, 2002.

Education
It is in the Cairo School District.

References

Unincorporated communities in Alexander County, Illinois
Unincorporated communities in Illinois
Cape Girardeau–Jackson metropolitan area